Berthoud may refer to:

Places
 Berthoud, Colorado, US
 Berthoud Pass, Colorado, US
 Burgdorf, Switzerland, (French: Berthoud)

See also

People
 Alfred Berthoud (1874–1939), Swiss professor of chemistry
 Denise Berthoud (1916–2005), Swiss lawyer and Red Cross executive
 Edward L. Berthoud (1828–1910), American military officer and engineer
 Eric Berthoud (1900–1989), British oil man and diplomat 
 Ferdinand Berthoud (1727–1807), French chronometer-maker
 Henri Berthoud (1877–1948), Swiss civil servant and congressman
 Jean Berthoud (1846–1916), Swiss lawyer and politician
 John Berthoud (1962–2007), American lobbyist, president of the National Taxpayers Union
 Martin Berthoud (1931–2022), British diplomat
 Raymonde Berthoud (1919–2007), Swiss Red Cross worker in Hungary